The Serbian Literary Guild or Serbian Literary Cooperative is Serbia's oldest writers' organization and the second oldest still existing publishing house after Matica srpska.

History
It was founded in Belgrade on 29 April 1892 in the no longer existing building of the Royal Serbian Academy of Sciences and Arts by sixteen prominent people of the cultural, scientific and political life of that time. Since its inception, the traditional institution has edited works by both Serbian and international authors and finally contributed to promotion and dissemination of Serbian and other translated world's literature. The traditional corporation has thus made an important contribution to the Serbian cultural life for more than a century. The cooperative's coat of arms was designed by Jovan Jovanović Zmaj.

During the Kingdom of Serbia the Guild had 11,000 members in Serbia and the Balkans and operated as a major publishing house, but its actual role was that of an educational institution that carefully fostered national culture and ideas of South-Slavic unity as well. The Guild translated numerous Greek and Roman classics as well as French literature of the time. Their works were smuggled in Slavic provinces under Austrian rule, as the Austrian authorities considered the works to be liberally and nationally charged.

Among the numerous publications of the Literary Cooperative can be found many translated works of international writers such as Jorge Amado, Ludovico Ariosto, Thomas Babington Macauley, Honoré de Balzac, Charles Baudelaire, Beaumarchais, Lord Byron, Luís Vaz de Camões, Albert Camus, Geoffrey Chaucer, Paul Claudel, James Fenimore Cooper, Alphonse Daudet, Charles Dickens, Charles Diehl, Maurice Druon, George Eliot, Thomas Stearns Eliot, Euripides, Richard J. Evans, William Faulkner, Gustave Flaubert, Benjamin Franklin, Oliver Goldsmith, Johann Wolfgang von Goethe, Peter Handke, Thomas Hardy, Ludwik Hirszfeld, Victor Hugo, Aldous Huxley, Henry James, Franz Kafka, Søren Kierkegaard, Rudyard Kipling, David Lodge, André Malraux, Christopher Marlowe, Herman Melville, Prosper Mérimée, Molière, Eugene O’Neill, Joyce Carol Oates, Edgar Allan Poe, France Prešeren, Francisco de Quevedo, Rainer Maria Rilke, Isak Samokovlija, Friedrich von Schiller, Arthur Schnitzler, Albert Schweitzer, Walter Scott, William Shakespeare, Henryk Sienkiewicz, Aleksandr Solzhenitsyn, Stendhal, Hippolyte Taine, Henry David Thoreau, Leo Tolstoy, François Villon, Virgil, Oscar Wilde and Thomas Wolfe.

Presidents
 Stojan Novaković, 1892—1895
 Ljubomir Kovačević, 1895—1898
 Pera Đorđević, 1898—1902
 Ljubomir Stojanović, 1902—1904
 Ljubomir Jovanović, 1904—1906
 Dobroslav Ružić, 1906—1908
 Stojan Novaković, 1908—1915
 Sreta Stojković, 1920—1928
 Pavle Popović, 1928—1937
 Marko Car, 1937—1941
 Tihomir Đorđević, 1941—1942
 Veljko Petrović, 1945—1952
 Miloš N. Đurić, 1952—1957
 Vojislav Đurić, 1957—1961
 Milan Đoković, 1961—1962
 Svetislav Đurić, 1962—1966
 Milan Đoković, 1966—1969
 Dobrica Ćosić, 1969—1972
 Risto Tošović, 1973—1986
 Radovan Samardžić, 1988—1994
 Branko V. Radičević, 1995—1997
 Novica Petković, 1997—1999
 Milisav Savić, 2000—2001
 Slavenko Terzić, 2001—2005
 Slobodan Rakitić, 2005—2013
 Milovan Danojlić, 2013–

References

Book publishing companies
Publishing companies established in 1892
Serbian writers' organizations
Publishing companies of Serbia